The Montachusett Region (also known as North County) is a region comprising several cities and towns in the north-central area of Massachusetts surrounding Fitchburg. As it has no legal standing in state government, definitions of the region vary.

The terms, which are used interchangeably, are usually understood to refer to the area economically tied with the cities of Gardner, Fitchburg and Leominster. The "North County" label—the county referred to is Worcester County—is often used to emphasize the area's distance and separate political identity from the county seat at Worcester.

The region is sometimes defined as including Fitchburg suburbs in the northwestern corner of Middlesex County, Massachusetts. The region's leading daily newspaper, the Sentinel & Enterprise, is published in Fitchburg. Another, the Telegram & Gazette of Worcester, publishes a "North County" daily edition and Montachusett T&G semiweekly insert, both of which cover most of the areas usually considered parts of the North County and Montachusett regions.

Montachusett–North County towns include (towns in Middlesex County marked with *):

 Ashburnham
 Ashby*
 Athol
 Ayer*
 Clinton
 Fitchburg
 Gardner
 Harvard
 Hubbardston
 Lancaster
 Leominster
 Lunenburg
 Petersham
 Phillipston
 Princeton
 Royalston
 Shirley*
 Sterling
 Templeton
 Townsend*
 Westminster
 Winchendon

See also
 South County
 Montachusett Regional Transit Authority

References

Geography of Worcester County, Massachusetts
Regions of Massachusetts